The majority of Indonesia's railways are on Java, used for both passenger and freight transport. There are three noncontinuous railway networks in Sumatra (Aceh and North Sumatra; West Sumatra; South Sumatra and Lampung) while two new networks are being developed in Kalimantan and Sulawesi. Indonesia has finalized its plan for a national railway network recently.  According to the plan, 3,200 km of train tracks that will criss-cross the islands of Sumatra, Java, Kalimantan, and Sulawesi, it has been touted as the most extensive railway project in Indonesia since its independence from the Dutch in 1945. Indonesia targets to extend the national railway network to 10,524 kilometres by 2030. As of September 2022, the network spans 7,032km.

Urban railway exist in form of commuter rail in all provinces and metropolitan areas of Java – notably in Jakarta – as well as Medan, North Sumatra. New mass rapid transit and light rail transit system are currently being introduced in Jakarta and Palembang, South Sumatra.

Despite Indonesia having a left-hand running for roads, most of the railway lines use right-hand running due to Dutch legacy.

Newer constructions in Sumatra including Aceh, Kalimantan, Sulawesi, and Papua, along with the Jakarta LRT and Jakarta-Bandung HSR, are using the  gauge. Most of the Jakarta metropolitan area is electrified at 1500 V DC overhead.

Indonesia's railways are primarily operated by the state-owned Kereta Api Indonesia (KAI), its commuter subsidiary KAI Commuter, and the airport rail link subsidiary KAI Bandara. The infrastructure is state-owned, and companies pay a fee for using the railways.

Various narrow gauge industrial tramways operate in Java and Sumatra, serving the sugarcane and oil palm industries.

History

The first railway line in Indonesia opened in 1867 and was initially laid to standard gauge size. The railways were gradually expanded by both the state and private companies.

The Japanese occupation and the Indonesian War of Independence left Indonesia's railways in a poor condition. A batch of 100 steam locomotives were ordered in 1950, and dieselisation started in 1953. By the 1980s most mainline services had been dieselised. Electric multiple units were obtained from Japan beginning in the 1970s, replacing 60-year-old electric locomotives.

Since the independence era, all mainline railways in Indonesia have been managed by the state. The owners of the private railway were compensated first, but the system was fully nationalised in 1971.

Construction of new railway lines has been scarce, and most new construction is concentrated on double- and quad-tracking of existing railway lines. Most of the former tramway lines have been closed, reducing the mileage from about 7000 km to only 3000 km.

Operators
There are a bunch of passenger and freight rail companies in Indonesia:
 PT Kereta Api Indonesia (KAI) — operates local, regional, and intercity trains
 PT Railink (KAI Bandara) — operates airport rail link services, joint venture with Angkasa Pura II
 PT Kereta Commuter Indonesia (KAI Commuter) — operates commuter rail services
 PT Kereta Api Logistik (KAI Logistik) — operates courier-by-rail services
 PT MRT Jakarta — operates Jakarta MRT, province-owned company of Special Capital Region of Jakarta
 PT LRT Jakarta — operates Jakarta LRT, subsidiary of Jakpro, a province-owned company of Special Capital Region of Jakarta
 PT Angkasa Pura II — operates Soekarno-Hatta Airport Skytrain
 PT Kereta Cepat Indonesia–China — planned to operate Jakarta–Bandung high-speed rail, joint venture of PT Pilar Sinergi BUMN Indonesia (consortium of KAI, Wijaya Karya, Perkebunan Nusantara VIII, and Jasa Marga) and Beijing Yawan HSR Co. Ltd. (consortium of China Railway International, China Railway Group, Sinohydro Corporation, CRRC Corporation, and China Railway Signal and Communication)

Some agricultural companies also operates industrial railways:
 Perkebunan Nusantara (state-owned)
 PT Perkebunan Nusantara II — operates palm oil trains
 PT Perkebunan Nusantara IV — operates palm oil trains
 PT Perkebunan Nusantara IX — operates sugarcane lines and tourist train
 PT Bakrie Sumatra Plantations (part of Bakrie Group) — operates rubber and palm oil freight trains
 PT Tanjung Enim Lestari — operates pulp freight trains

Rail infrastructures by region

Java

The first railways in Indonesia were built on the island of Java, using  gauge. During the Japanese occupation, they were converted to  gauge. The Javanese network train (in Java Island) is divided into nine operating divisions.

Sumatra

As of 2013, there are 1,869 kilometres of track in Sumatra, of which 1,348 km are operational. Several unconnected railway networks were built in the time of the Dutch East Indies:
Banda Aceh-Lhokseumawe-Besitang-Medan-Tebingtinggi-Pematang Siantar-Rantau Prapat in northern Sumatra (the Banda Aceh-Besitang section was closed in 1971, but is being rebuilt, as of 2011 ), using Track gauge .
Padang-Solok-Bukittinggi in West Sumatra
Bandar Lampung-Palembang-Lahat-Lubuk Linggau in southern Sumatra.

Plans to connect up and fix these isolated lines are included in the Trans-Sumatra Railway plan. Railway services in Sumatra by operational is divided into four regional divisions, which are:

Kalimantan
The first railway network in Kalimantan island was opened in 1908, serving the oil refinery and port of Balikpapan. It was closed in 1950. In 2010, plans were announced for Kalimantan to get a 122 km long  railway for the transport of coal between the  mine and the port of Bengalon. In January 2016, Russian Railways reported that the construction of a railway in Kalimantan will finish in 2019. However, in 2022 Russian Railways withdraw from the initial investment plan so the railway construction was canceled.

Lesser Sunda Islands
In 2019, it was reported that governor of Bali Wayan Koster is planned to build railways on Bali with  standard gauge. The railway "is keen to improve Bali's transportation infrastructure and is considering plans to build an electric rail network across the island".

Sulawesi

The first railway network in Sulawesi was opened in 1922 connecting Makassar and Takalar, but was closed in 1930 due to poor revenue. The newer Trans-Sulawesi Railway is  under construction as of 2022. It will be built with  standard gauge, which is wider than the cape gauge used in Java and most of Sumatra to accommodate more weight and speed.

Papua
A 440 km railway from Manokwari to Sorong in West Papua province is planned. In Papua there is also a subway line assigned to transport mining products which is located in the Grasberg mine, Mimika Regency, near Puncak Jaya, and operated by PT. Freeport Indonesia and has been operating since 2019.  Besides that, a train line is also operated specifically for students at the Nemangkawi Mining Institute.

Rolling stock

Preserved locomotives

Indonesia had various types of locomotives, being the legacy of the many different companies. Surprisingly, only five steam locomotives remain in operable condition, with two located in the Ambarawa Railway Museum, two in Surakarta running the Jaladara excursion train, and one in the Sawahlunto Railway Museum. On the other hand, static steam locomotive displays are located in the Transportation Museum (under the auspices of the Department of Transportation) in Jakarta's Taman Mini Indonesia Indah (Beautiful Indonesia in Miniature Park) and Ambarawa Railway Museum (managed by PT Kereta Api) in Central Java. Plinthed locomotives can also be found in most cities and towns. Somewhat surprisingly, few non-locomotive rolling stock were preserved.

With the Asian economic crisis of 1997, remaining hulks of steam locomotives formerly standing in former depots became valuable for their scrap value, and by 2000, most locomotives not already plinthed or sent to museums were scrapped, presumably illegally.

Four operable industrial steam locomotives are present, with two more preserved, at the Cepu Forest Railway. This currently represents the largest concentration of active preserved steam locomotives in Indonesia.

Several "last" steam locomotives were built for Indonesia. E10 60, a 1966-built rack steam locomotive (Esslingen 5316) is operable in Sawahlunto Railway Museum. BB84, the last Mallet locomotive built for a non-tourist railway (according to Durrant) was built by Nippon Sharyo Keizo Kaisha in 1962 (works number 2007). This locomotive was plinthed in Banda Aceh and survived the December 2004 tsunami. The locomotive is in rather poor condition with its valve gear and cylinder pistons missing (as of March 2006).

SS 1600-class steam locomotive No. 1622 "Sri Gunung" (Mountain Queen), a  mallet built in 1928, preserved in the Dutch Railway Museum.

The Trangkil No. 4 (Hunslet Engine Company 3902) was built in 1971, being the last steam locomotive built at Hunslet's Jack Lane Works in Leeds, England. The locomotive was used on the Trangkil sugar mill estate on Java. It has been repatriated to the UK in 2004.

Sragi No.1 (Krauss) was built in 1899, restored to working order in 2008. This locomotive is a former sugar cane carrier in Pekalongan, Central Java. Then there are two other locomotives namely Pakis Baru No. 1 (Orenstein & Koppel built 1900) and Pakis Baru No. 5 (Orenstein & Koppel built 1905), both of which were former locomotives belonging to the Pakis Baru sugar factory in Pati, Central Java. All locomotives now preserved at Statfold Barn Railway, England.

Diesel locomotives
As of 2016, PT Kereta Api operates about 350 units of diesel locomotives divided into classes in Java and Sumatra used both for passenger and freight services. The first diesel locomotive owned by PT Kereta Api was CC200 class, built by General Electric in 1953.

Electric trains
As of August 2017, PT Kereta Api's commuter subsidiary, Kereta Commuter Indonesia, operates 758 units of electric multiple units (EMU) in Greater Jakarta area. Most EMUs operated in Jakarta are secondhand trains acquired from major urban railway operators in Greater Tokyo in Japan, such as East Japan Railway Company and Tokyo Metro.

Usage

Passenger services

KAI provides extensive passenger services. Various classes are available, from luxury class with reclining seats and plane - like facilities, executive class with air conditioner and reclining seat comparable to the better classes of other countries' railways, business coaches which recently have been equipped with air conditioner and reclining seats much like executive class, to the hard bench, but still air conditioned, economy class coaches for cheaper trains. In last couple of years, the business and economic class are in the process of being equipped with air conditioned system. The whole process was completed in early 2013.

Sleeper trains have existed in Indonesia. The last all-sleeper train service was Bima express train which ran from 1967 to 1984 when it was changed to mostly coach, leaving only one or two sleeping cars. It ran in this configuration until 1995, when the sleeper cars were withdrawn and modified into seating coach. Since 2018, sleeper trains have been re-activated for the Argo Bromo Anggrek (Jakarta to Surabaya), Taksaka (Jakarta to Yogyakarta), Argo Lawu and Argo Dwipangga (Jakarta to Solo), and Gajayana (Jakarta to Malang).

In Java, most trains connect Jakarta and the hinterland - regional (or "cross-country" services) have not been fully developed. Between pairs of important cities such as Jakarta and Bandung, intensive hourly services are provided.

Most passenger trains in Indonesia, except commuter locals, are named. The names varies from plainly descriptive such as Depok Ekspres (a former fast service between Jakarta and Depok), through Logawa (name of a river near Purwokerto, which is served by the train), Argo Lawu (Mt. Lawu, an extinct volcano near Solo, which is served by the said express train), to more or less meaningless, though romantic, names such as Bangunkarta (abbreviation of names of cities it serves: Jombang-Madiun-Jakarta) and Matarmaja (Malang-Blitar-Madiun-Jakarta).

Railway passenger services experienced a renaissance in the 1995-1999 period, with the introduction of many new passenger express services. With the advent of cheap airplane tickets, KAI experienced a downturn in the number of passengers carried, though the number has stabilized and most trains remain at more than 50% occupancy rate.

Argo Network

Note: K.A. Argo Gede and also K.A. Parahyangan no longer exist. As a replacement, K.A. Argo Parahyangan trains operate the same routing as a merge of K.A. Argo Gede and K.A. Parahyangan.

Women only carriages
As a response to many reports of sexual harassment in public places, including commuter trains and bus, KAI launched women-only carriages in some KRL Jabodetabek commuter trains in Jakarta metropolitan area in August 2010.
On May 13, 2013 KAI changed women-only trains to regular trains which at the front and back of the train has a coach for women only. This rule apply in KRL Jabodetabek.

Priority seat 
KAI designates priority seats to elderly passengers, pregnant women, disabled passengers and mother with infant to ride public transport with an equal degree of access and comfort as other people. Priority seat not only in the first and end of the train like in women only carriages, but eight seats in each carriage are designated as priority seats. This apply in KRL Commuterline.

Priority Class (Sleeper Train) 
KAI relaunched the Sleeper Train service on June 11, 2018. This sleeper train is equipped with excellent facilities even in the same class as a first class aircraft cabin. The first route for sleeper train is from Gambir Jakarta to Surabaya. The Luxury Sleeper Train is managed by another KAI subsidiary, KAI Wisata.

Freight services

The railway system in Java is more or less a passenger-oriented system, and there are few freight services, due to the limited capacity of the tracks. Some notable freight services in Java include the Kalimas container train and the Parcel train between Jakarta and Surabaya, petroleum trains between refineries or oil pipe terminals and oil depots, and quartz sand trains in Central Java. Besides being operated for Krakatau Steel, the train will later be used to supply steel from Cilegon to other areas.

But in recent years, there have been many efforts to increase freight traffic in Java by introducing the GE CC206 locomotives, as well as building double-track lines that connect Jakarta and Surabaya on the North Coast line to increase the number of container trains between both cities. Many container ports have also been built in intermediate cities and towns. This effort has already attracted some customers who normally shipped their products via road.

The system in South Sumatra is rather freight-oriented. Coal unit trains, carrying coal for an electricity plant is given priority over passenger trains, and Pulp unit trains to transport pulp for paper mills. In West Sumatra, the remaining railway line serves the cement plant at Indarung, near Padang, and in North Sumatra, several oil palm and rubber plantations are served by freight trains.

In Papua, Freeport Indonesia uses underground trains to carry ore from mine to mill.

Urban rail and rail-based rapid transit

Trams formerly existed in Jakarta, Surabaya, Malang, and Semarang before their service was closed after independence. In Jakarta the tram lines are operated using track gauge  operated by Bataviasche Verkeers Maatschappij and Pengangkutan Penumpang Djakarta, while in other areas track gauge  were used.
 
In Greater Jakarta, KRL Commuterline is one of operational urban rail network, serving commuter routes which comprises cities of DKI Jakarta, Depok, Bogor, Bekasi, Tangerang, and South Tangerang as well as regencies of Bogor, Bekasi, and Lebak. The other operational urban rail networks are Jakarta provincially-owned Jakarta MRT, Jakarta LRT, and Soekarno-Hatta Airport Rail Link to support the public transport network in the area.

Regional rail functions as commuter rail in Greater Surabaya, so technically there is no urban rail network. However, there are plans for a mass rapid transit network in and around Surabaya. Surabaya MRT planned with Track gauge  in Dupak line (Manyar-Dupak-Juanda), Rungkut line (Dupak-Rungkut-Waru-Sidoarjo), Krian line (Manyar-Krian-Sidoarjo), Tanjung Perak line (Tanjung Perak-Wonokromo-Sidoarjo), Juanda line (Juanda-Sidoarjo) and Other Loop line (Dupak-Rungkut-Krian-Dupak). A 32 km diesel line from Mojokerto to Sidoarjo has been put into service, with 6 daily return trips.

Greater Medan is served by Kualanamu Airport Rail Link. Sri Lelawangsa commuter train connects Medan and nearby Binjai.

In Palembang, Palembang Light Rail Transit had operate in June 2018, before the 2018 Asian Games.

In greater Yogyakarta and Surakarta, KAI Commuter Yogyakarta Line operates between Yogyakarta, Klaten and Surakarta. Prambanan Express connects Yogyakarta with Purworejo. Yogyakarta International and Adisumarmo Airport Rail Links exists in Yogyakarta and Surakarta, respectively.

In Padang, Minangkabau Express is in operation.

Tourist rail
In Indonesia, there are several train lines that were built for tourist destinations, such as the Gamplong tram line in Sleman Regency, Special Region of Yogyakarta using  track gauge, the Ancol mini train line in Jakarta using   track gauge, and the Taman Mini Indonesia Indah (TMII) tourist mini train line in Jakarta using 670 mm track gauge. In addition to operating mini trains, TMII also operates SHS-23 Aeromovel Indonesia or Titihan Samirono, a light rail which was initially a wind-powered aeromovel.

Industrial railway

Sugar cane
The use of trains as transport from plantations dates back to the 1800s. In the past, to transport sugar cane from plantations to sugar factories, sugar mill companies used narrow gauge trains to transport their sugar cane products. Around the 1970s, the transportation of sugarcane from plantations to factories began using trucks. Since the early 90s, transportation of sugarcane from plantations in Indonesia has been almost entirely using trucks due to lower operational costs, time efficiency, and the reduction in sugarcane land around the sugar factory area.

In addition, due to the increasingly rapid development of transportation, road infrastructure is getting better, and lorries are getting old and slow, over time the use of lorry trains is no longer used, although until now there are still some sugar factories that still operate trains to sugarcane plantations. In addition, some of the train lines are used for tourism, some use steam locomotives and also diesel locomotives. Most of the sugarcane rail lines are operated by PT. Perkebunan Nusantara IX

The use of track gauges in sugar factories in Indonesia varies from place to place, for example:

 Track gauge , used in PG Djatiwangi Majalengka, PG Djatibarang Brebes, PG Pangka Tegal, PG Cepiring Kendal, PG Soedhono Ngawi, PG Tulangan Sidoarjo, PG Gendhing Probolinggo, and PG Pandji Situbondo. 
 Track gauge , only used in PG Kadhipaten Majalengka.
 Track gauge , used in PG Gempol Cirebon, PG Tersana Baru Cirebon, PG Ketanggungan Barat Brebes, PG Soemberhardjo Pemalang, PG Rendeng Kudus, PG Kalibagor Banyumas, PG Gondang Winangoen Klaten, PG Kartasoera Surakarta, PG Rejosarie Magetan, PG Poerwodadie Magetan, PG Arasoe Bone Sulawesi, PG Sragie Pekalongan, and others (almost all sugar factories in Java use this track gauge).
 Track gauge , only used in PG Sindanglaut Cirebon.
 Track gauge ,  used in PG Bandjaratma Brebes, PG Pakis Baru Pati, PG Trangkil Pati, PG Ceper Baru Klaten, PG Tjolomadoe Solo, and PG Tasikmadu Karanganyar.

Palm oil

In Indonesia there are several palm oil companies that operate trains to transport palm fruit, either from oil palm plantations to mills or just as a means of passing. The oil palm carriage is commonly referred to as "Lori Muntik". The palm oil mills are spread across Sumatra and Kalimantan. Several large palm oil companies that use this train, including PT. Socfindo, PT. BSP, PTPN II, PTPN IV in Sumatra, and several other palm oil mills.

Rubber plantations

In North Sumatra there is a rubber factory that still operates trains to transport rubber latex to the factory, one of which is PT. Bakrie Sumatra Plantations. The train was pulled by a small diesel locomotive made by Hokuriku, Schoma, and several other small locomotives.

Mining & oil transport
PT Freeport Indonesia, which is a mining company, operates underground mining trains to facilitate the transportation of copper, gold and silver ore materials to the processing plant location at Mile 74, Tembagapura, Mimika, Papua. The locomotive used is the MMT-M-270-BDE diesel locomotive made by Schalker Eisenhütte Maschinenfabrik, Germany.

Cikotok, Banten formerly known as one of the gold mining areas in Indonesia operated by PT. Antam. In order to smooth the flow of raw gold distribution, a railway line was operated. The train used is a small train with a track gauge of about 700mm. However, because the gold stock here ran out, in 2016 the mine was closed and only ruins were left, as well as the Cirotan mine monument which contained an artificial diesel locomotive Deutz-Fahr on display at that place. Apart from Cikotok, PT Antam also operates mining rail lines in other areas, one of which is in Bogor, West Java

In Sebelimbingan, Pulau Laut, South Borneo there is a relic Dutch coal mine. At that time, a railway line was built from the mine site which was used to transport coal to the port and later brought it to the Netherlands. Now the mines and railroad tracks are just ruins. In addition, in several other areas in South Kalimantan mining railway lines have also been built, such as in Amuntai, Martapura, several other places.

Until around the 1950s, the oil refinery that is now owned by Pertamina in Balikpapan still operated mini trains with small track gauges to transport oil from the refinery to the port. Currently there is no relic left.

High-speed rail

In recent decades, Javan transportation backbones — north coast road and railway system that serves Jakarta-Surabaya corridor, has suffered greatly from both freight and passenger congestion. The plan to build a high-speed railway system in Java has been around for many years. However, it was not until 2008 that the idea had been contemplated seriously. It was Japan International Cooperation Agency's proposal that initiated the idea to build high-speed rail for the Indonesian island of Java, linking up the densely populated corridor from the capital Jakarta to Surabaya city (covering 730 km) in East Java. Japan is eager to export their Shinkansen high-speed rail technology abroad. Following up JICA's initial study in 2012, the detailed feasibility study was concluded in 2014. In recent years, Indonesia has been undergoing a revival in railway expansion and upgrades. The high-speed rail corridors have been proposed but not implemented yet, since it was deemed too costly.

In April 2015, China had entered the race with a counter-offer to build the Jakarta-Bandung high-speed rail in Indonesia. A bid which alarmed Japan that has been nurtured the idea for years.

In July 2015, the Indonesian government announced their plan to build the high-speed rail system connecting Jakarta and Bandung, and devised a competition between Japan and China train-makers as potential bidders. Japan and China have expressed their interest in the project; both countries had done comprehensive studies of the project.

In late September 2015, Indonesia awarded this multibillion-dollar railway project to China over Japan.

The proposed high-speed rail will connect the nation's capital Jakarta with Bandung city in neighboring West Java province, covering a distance of 150 kilometers, and is also expected to expand further, connecting to Indonesia's second largest city, Surabaya in East Java.

The project has been delayed several times, first due to careless construction that affected nearby roads, then due to coronavirus pandemic restrictions.

In December 2015 discussion for the Jakarta-Surabaya high-speed rail was commenced by the Indonesian Coordinating Minister of Maritime and Resources. Academicians from two major universities in Indonesia, and employees from Japan International Cooperation Agency, were invited to attend the discussion.

In May 2020, coordinating Economics Minister Airlangga Hartarto announced that the government had decided to extend the China-backed Jakarta-Bandung high-speed railway project to Surabaya. The line would run along a southern route to connect the Jakarta-Bandung project with Surabaya via Kertajati, where the government recently built a new airport, as well as via Surakarta and Yogyakarta. Meanwhile Japan is working on the Java North Line Upgrading Project, which would connect Jakarta and Surabaya with a route along the northern coast of Java via Cirebon in West Java and Semarang in Central Java. A proposed travel speed of 150 km per hour for the 720-km railway connection would allow for the use of existing tracks, hence resulting in the lower development cost of about $5 billion.

Heritage railways
There are several railway lines that are currently only used as tourist train lines. Some of them in Java have the Tuntang-Bedono train line in the Ambarawa Railway Museum area which has a jagged train line. Tourist trains here are pulled using steam locomotive B25 and diesel locomotive D 301.  Then in the Cepu, Central Java area there is a train line belonging to Perum Perhutani which was formerly used as a wooden carriage. Now it is only used as a tourist train line called Cepu Loco Tour or Cepu Forest Railway. This tourist train is pulled using a C-2902 steam locomotive and a diesel locomotive. This railway line operated by Perum Perhutani.

The city of Surakarta has an active railway line which is adjacent to the main road of the city, Jalan Slamet Riyadi. The downtown rail line connects Purwosari Station with Wonogiri Station in Wonogiri Regency. The Jaladara train is served by the steam locomotive C1218 and D52, which includes a small locomotive used for horizontal routes. This locomotive pulls two carriages made of genuine teak wood made in 1920 with the codes CR16 and CR144. The steam train was an old German-made train in 1896 and was sent to Indonesia that same year by the Dutch East Indies Government as a means of short-distance transportation.

In Sumatra, the Sawahlunto Railway Museum is located on the Sawahlunto-Muaro Kalaban railway line. In the past, this route was used to transport coal from Sawahlunto to Padang. Currently the line has been deactivated, and the plan is for the Sawahlunto-Muarokalaban segment to be reactivated as a Mak Itam tourist train line which will later be towed by the Esslingen E10 steam locomotive. The line is listed as a world heritage by UNESCO.

In Lebong Tandai, Bengkulu, there is a Molek train using a track gauge . Molek is not the first to be in Lebong Tandai. In fact, Molek was born from the limitations of residents in remote areas of the forest after the death of the Netherlands and an Australian-owned company that finished mining gold there. Previously, when the Dutch entered the bowels of the forest in Napal Putih Subdistrict, North Bengkulu to hunt for gold veins in 1901. The carriages and seats were made of long boards wrapped in leather and makeshift foam.

List of all locomotives in Indonesia
This is a list of locomotives in Indonesia that have been/are/will be operated.

Steam locomotives
All steam locomotives in Indonesia were operated during the Dutch colonial era to the PJKA era, during the 1980s era. In Greater Jakarta, steam locomotives were operated between 1930s and 1980-1990s (eg: steam trams were actually closed in the early 1980s electricity was actually closed at the end of the decade 1990s due to being displaced by electric rail train, diesel locomotive, city transportation and the emergence of ojek motorcycle ). The first locomotives in Indonesia were NIS 1 and 2 belonging to Nederlands-Indische Spoorweg Maatschappij, to serve the Samarang NIS-Tanggung railway line. The following list of steam locomotives in Indonesia does not include all steam locomotives operated by all train operators in the Dutch East Indies. The following is a list of steam locomotives in Indonesia.

Track gauge 
 Locomotive NIS 107, build by Hanomag (1907)

Track gauge 

 Locomotive B1
 Locomotive B10, build by Beyer Peacock 
 Locomotive B11, build by Beyer Peacock (1883–1898)
 Locomotive B12, build by Werkspoor & Beyer Peacock (1900–1902)
 Locomotive B13, build by Hanomag (1879–1886)
 Locomotive B14
 Locomotive B15
 Locomotive B16, build by Hohenzollern (1896–1900)
 Locomotive B17, build by Hohenzollern (189–1900)
 Locomotive B18
 Locomotive B19
 Locomotive B20, build by Beyer Peacock (1900–1907)
 Locomotive B21
 Locomotive B22, build by Hartmann (1898–1901)
 Locomotive B23, build by Henschel 
 Locomotive B24
 Locomotive B25, build by Maschinenfabrik Esslingen (1902)
 Locomotive B26
 Locomotive B27, build by Hartmann (1912, 1914, & 1921)
 Locomotive B50, build by Sharp Stewart 
 Locomotive B51, build by Hartmann, Hanomag & Werkspoor
 Locomotive B52, build by Hartmann & Chamnitz (1908–1913)
 Locomotive B53, build by Hartmann Chamnitz & Werkspoor
 Locomotive BB7
 Locomotive BB8, build by Nippon Sharyo (1962)
 Locomotive BB10, build by Hartmann, Chamnitz & Scwhartzkopff (1899–1908)
 Locomotive C2
 Locomotive C3
 Locomotive C4
 Locomotive C5
 Locomotive C6
 Locomotive C7
 Locomotive C8
 Locomotive C10
 Locomotive C11, build by Hartmann (1879–1891)
 Locomotive C12, build by Saechs, Maschinenfabrik vorm. Richard Hartmann & Chemnitz (1893–1902)
 Locomotive C13
 Locomotive C14, build by Beyer Peacock (1895–1910)
 Locomotive C15, build by Hartmann & Werkspoor (1897–1900)
 Locomotive C16, build by Hartmann (1899–1908)
 Locomotive C17, build by Hartmann (1899–1902)
 Locomotive C18, build by Hartmann (1908)
 Locomotive C19, build by Hartmann (1898–1902)
 Locomotive C20, build by Hartmann (1903 & 1912)
 Locomotive C21, build by Krauss (1903–1926)
 Locomotive C22, build by Werkspoor
 Locomotive C23, build by Hartmann 
 Locomotive C24, build by Werkspoor
 Locomotive C25, build by Hanomag
 Locomotive C26, build by Henschel (1914–1926)
 Locomotive C27, build by Schweizerische Lokomotiv-und Maschinefabrik, Armstrong-Whitworth & Werkspoor (1916–1922)
 Locomotive C28, build by Hanomag, Henschel Kasseel, & Esslingen (1921)
 Locomotive 29, build by Hanomag (1922)
 Locomotive 30, build by Hohenzollern, Borsig, Hanomag & Werkspoor (1929–1930)
 Locomotive 31, build by Hohenzollern, Borsig, Hanomag, & Werkspoor
 Locomotive 32, build by Nippon Sharyo
 Locomotive 33, build by Esslingen (1891–1904)
 Locomotive C50, build by Hartmann & SLM (1900)
 Locomotive 51, build by Beyer Peacock
 Locomotive C52, build by Werkspoor, Henschel & Beyer Peacock (1918–1922)
 Locomotive 53, build by Werkspoor N.V (1918–1922)
 Locomotive 54, build by Hartmann & Beyer Peacock
 Locomotive CC10, build by Hartmann (1904)
 Locomotive CC50, build by Werkspoor and SLM (1927–1928)
 Locomotive 1
 Locomotive 10, build by Hartmann
 Locomotive 11, build by Hohenzollern
 Locomotive 13, build by Hohenzollern
 Locomotive 14, build by Hanomag & Werkspoor (1912–1922)
 Locomotive 15, build by Hanomag
 Locomotive 16
 Locomotive 17
 Locomotive 18
 Locomotive 50, build by Schweirische Lokomotiv und Maschinefabrik Winterthur, Hanomag, Hartmann & Werkspoor (1914, 1915, & 1921)
 Locomotive 51
 Locomotive 52, build by Fried Krupp (1951–1955)
 Locomotive DD50, build by American Locomotive Company (1916)
 Locomotive DD51, build by ALCO (1919)
 Locomotive DD52, build by Werkspoor, Hanomag and Hartmann (1923–1924)
 Locomotive E10, build by Maschinenfabrik Esslingen, Swiss Locomotive and Machine Works, & Nippon Sharyo (1922–1928, 1964)
 Locomotive F10, build by Hanomag & Werkspoor (1896)
 Locomotive DSM 22, build by Hohenzolllern
 Locomotive DSM 28, build by Hohenzollern
 Locomotive DSM 38, build by Hartmann
 Locomotive DSM 48, build by Werkspoor
 Locomotive DSM 55, build by Werkspoor

Track gauge 
 Pakis Baru No. 1, build by Orenstein & Koppel
 Pakis Baru No. 5, build by Orenstein & Koppel

Track gauge 
 Banjaratma No. 10
 Ceper Baru No. 5
 Colomadu No. 1
 Pakis Baru No. 2
 Tasikmadu No. 3 1908, build by Borsig
 Tasikmadu No. 5
 Tasikmadu TM 1, build by Orenstein & Koppel
 Tasikmadu TM 5 
 Tasikmadu TM IV
 Tasikmadu TM VI, build by Orenstein & Koppel
 Tasikmadu TM IX (Lokomotiv Doon)
 Tasikmadu TM X
 Tasikmadu TM XIV
 Trangkil No. 4, build by Hunslet

Track gauge 
 Sindanglaut No. 4
 Sindanglaut No. 7
 Sindanglaut No. 8
 Sindanglaut No. 10
 Sindanglaut No. 11
 Sindanglaut No. 13

Track gauge 
 Bromo No. 5 (owned by PG Olean)
 Gempol No.2
 Gondang Winangun No. 14
 Kalibagor No. 20
 Kartasura No.5
 Kedawung No. 14
 Ketanggungan No. 11
 Olean No. 1
 Olean No. 7
 Pagottan No. 7
 Purwodadi No. 1 
 Purwodadi No. 10 
 Rejosari No. 10
 Rendeng No. 6
 Semboro No. 14 
 Semboro No. 15
 Semboro No. 29, build by Jungenthal 
 Semeru No. 4 (owned by PG Olean)
 Sragi No. 16
 Sumberharjo No. 3
 Sumberharjo No. 4, build by Ducroo & Brauns Locmotieffabriek
 Sumberharjo No. 10, build by ALCO 
 Sumberharjo No. 15
 Tersana No. 2
 Tersana No. 6
 Wringinanom No. 06

Track gauge 
 Kadhipaten No. 2
 Locomotive TD10, build by Werkspoor

Track gauge 
 Jatibarang 9, build by Arnold Jung Lokomotivfabrik
 Sragi No.1, build by Krauss
 Sragi No. 14 Max, build by Orenstein & Koppel

Track gauge 
 Cepiring No. 6
 Gendhing No. 8
 Jatibarang No. 9
 Jatibarang No 10
 Jatiwangi No. 5
 Locomotive SS 200T/300T
 Locomotive TC10, build by Hartmann
 Pangka No. 1, build by Jungenthal
 Pangka No. 3, build by ARN JUNG GmbH
 Pangka No. 10, build by Orenstein & Koppel
 Panji No. 15
 Suedhono No. 10
 Tulangan No. 5

Fireless steam locomotive

Track gauge 
 Pagottan No. 7, build by Orenstein & Koppel
 Pagottan No. 8, build by Orenstein & Koppel
 Semboro No. 2
 Semboro No. 03

Diesel locomotives
A diesel locomotive is a rail vehicle that uses the power of diesel to propel a whole series of trains.

Electric diesel 

Track gauge 
 DF4B, build by Sifang, Datong, Ziyang, & Dalian & Siemens (owned by Kereta Cepat Indonesia–China for the construction of the Jakarta-Bandung high-speed train)
 GK0C, build by CRRC Yangtze (owned by Krakatau Steel)

Track gauge 

 A200 (namely Gajah Mada)
 BB200, build by General Motors-Motive Division (1957)
 BB201, build by General Motors-Motive Division (1964)
 BB202, build by General Motors-Motive Division (1968–1971)
 BB203, build by General Electric Transportation (1978–1985)
 BB204, build by SLM (1982–1983)
 CC200, build by ALCO-General Electric (1953)
 CC201, build by General Electric Transportation (1976–1992)
 CC202, build by Progress Rail (1986–2008)
 CC203, build by GE Transportation & UGL Rail (1995–2000)
 CC204, build by PT INKA, under licensed by GE Transportation (2003–2011)
 CC205, build by Progress Rail (2011–now)
 CC206, build by General Electric (2012–2016)

Hydraulic diesel 

Track gauge 

 BB300, build by Fried Krupp (1958–1959)
 BB301, build by Fried Krupp-Krauss-Maffei (1964–1970)
 BB302, build by Henschel 
 BB303, build by Henschel (1973–1984)
 BB304, build by Fried Krupp (1976–1984)
 BB305, build by Nippon Sharyo, Jenbacher Werke & CFD 
 BB306, build by Henschel (1984)
 300, build by VEB Lokomotivbau Karl Marx Babelsberg
 C301, build by NCM Holland
 CC300, build by PT INKA (owned by Ditjen Perkeretaapian)
 300, build by Fried Krupp (1958)
 301, build by Fried Krupp (1962–1963)
 DD5512, build by Fuji Heavy Industry (owned by Ditjen Perkeretaapian)

Track gauge 
 C301, build by NCM Holland

Mechanic diesel 
Track gauge 
 B100, build by Balai Yasa Pengok Yogyakarta (1960)
 B200, build by Balai Yasa Yogyakarta (1961)
 B201, build by Balai Yasa Yogyakarta (1962)
 Bima Kunthing, build by BY Yogyakarta
 Kebo Kuning, build by Schoema
 Pelita 1, build by Balai Yasa Yogyakarta

Plantations diesel locomotive
Track gauge 
 Tasikmadu No. 21
 Tasikmadu No. 25

Track gauge 
 Sindanglaut No. 19

Track gauge 
 Kedawung No. 9, build by Schoema
 Madu Kismo No. 10
 PT. Antam Cikotok, build by Deutz-Fahr
 PT. Bakrie Sumatra Plantations (unknown fleet number), build by Hokuriku & Schoma
 PT. BSP (unknown number fleet), build by Hokuriku & Schoma
 PT. Socfindo (unknown number fleet), build by Hokuriku & Schoema
 PTPN II (unknown fleet number), build by Hokuriku & Schoema
 PTPN IV (unknown fleet number), build by Hokuriku & Schoema

Track gauge 
 Kadipaten No. 19

Track gauge 
 Pangkah No. 13
 Pangkah No. 15

Electrical locomotives 
Track gauge 
 ESS 3000, build by Swiss Locomotive & Machine Works, Brown, Boveri & Cie (1924-1927)
 ESS 3100
 ESS 3200, build by Werkspoor N.V 
 ESS 3300
 ESS 4000

Hybrid locomotive 
Track gauge 
 MMT-M-270-BDE, build by Schalker Eisenhutte Maschinenfabrik (owned by Freeport Indonesia for underground mining operations)

Towing train 
Track gauge 

 FIGEE or Si Bongkok, build by Haarlem
 UH-995
 Kirow
 Gottwald
 Brotoseno

See also

 Polsuska
 Transport in Indonesia
 List of named passenger trains of Indonesia
 List of railway stations in Indonesia
 List of railway companies in the Dutch East Indies
 List of defunct railway in Indonesia
 List of all locomotives in Indonesia

References

Sources
 United States Central Intelligence Agency (June 2, 2005), The World Fact Book: Indonesia.  Retrieved June 17, 2005.
 Garratt, Colin. The World Encyclopedia of Locomotives  Anness Publishing (London), 2003, p. 47.
 History of Railways in Indonesia

Further reading
 How the Railroad is Modernising Asia, The Advertiser, Adelaide, S. Australia, 22 March 1913. N.B.: The article is of approx. 1,500 words, covering approx. a dozen Asian countries.

External links

 Regulator

 Operators

 
Infrastructure in Indonesia
Indonesia